The Prophecy is the 34th book in the Animorphs series, authored by K.A. Applegate. It is known to have been ghostwritten by Melinda Metz. It is narrated primarily by Cassie and secondarily by Aldrea. It was published on September 27th, 1999.

Plot summary

Cassie comes home in owl morph to find a Hork-Bajir leaving the barn. Cassie realizes that if the Hork-Bajir is a Controller, the Yeerks might suspect that she is one of the "Andalite bandits". She attacks it, and nearly blinds him with her talons when she realizes it is in fact Jara Hamee. When she asks why he is there, he tells her that an Arn has come to the Hork-Bajir valley, and Toby wishes for their advice on what to do. Cassie tells the other Animorphs about the Arn the next day and they all agree to go.

The Arn's name is Quafijinivon, the last of the Arn. He tells them that he wishes to create a force of Hork-Bajir to fight the Yeerks on their home world, by taking a sample of each Hork-Bajir's DNA. The Hork-Bajirs accept, but Quafijinivon also wishes to find a stash of weapons hidden by Aldrea - Seerow's Daughter. They ask him how will he do this if she is dead, and he tells them about the ixcila of Aldrea he preserved, an electronic copy of her personality, thoughts, and brainwaves. The Arn says Aldrea must choose a host to enter, and they decide it will be either Rachel, because of her dangerous attitude, or Toby because she is her granddaughter. During the Atafalxical ceremony Cassie is chosen as the host instead, she is asked if she accepts and Jake shouts "No". Cassie feels she has no choice, and says yes.

The Chee take their place as humans while they're gone. When they make to the Hork-Bajir solar system, the ship is attacked by another Andalite ship. They cannot contact the ship because the Yeerks will pick up their signal. Ax refuses to fire back at the ship because he says he cannot attack a fellow Andalite for doing his job. Jake asks if Aldrea can do it and she says yes. She fires at the ship and destroys the engines, saving them. More Bug Fighters show up and Marco suggest that they move on, but Ax begs Jake to save the Andalite. Jake says they cannot leave, and they assist in destroying the Bug Fighters. Jake cuts the ensuing celebration short so they can focus on the task at hand.

When they make it to the Hork-Bajir home world, Quafijinivon goes to his lab to work on the DNA samples. Aldrea has an idea where the weapons might be stashed and they travel deep into the woods. To their horror, they find that the place has been turned into a giant Yeerk pool. That is when they come up with a bold plan to get into the pool, which Aldrea is totally against.

Cassie morphs into an osprey and the others morph insects, and go into Cassie's mouth. She gets as much altitude as she possibly can, and starts to demorph but keeps her wings and starts to morph into a humpback whale as well. She has to let her wings go and go full humpback whale at just the right moment or the plan will fail, but the Hork-Bajir Controllers already spot her in the sky, although they cannot make her out as a human because she is partly in whale morph, and start firing at her. This causes Aldrea to panic and try to convince Cassie to go full whale now. When she cannot she tries to take over, but Cassie overpowers her and waits until the time is right to morph fully. When she is in the pool, Jake and Rachel demorph and remorph into hammerhead sharks and attack the Taxxon Controllers, while Tobias and Ax go as Andalites and attack Hork-Bajir Controllers. Marco goes as a Hork-Bajir shouting, "Andalites everywhere, thousands of them, run!" causing them to flee. They break into the weapons stash, take them, and escape in a Yeerk ship, delivering them to the Arn.

At the end, Toby Hamee says that she wishes to stay on her homeworld and fight the Yeerks there. Aldrea does not want her great-granddaughter to suffer this fate, and thus comes up with a plan with Cassie and Ax to force her to stay in the Hork-Bajir Earth colony. Cassie successfully convinces Jake that Aldrea is trying to take control of her. In response, Ax takes Toby hostage, putting his tail blade to her throat and threatens to kill Toby if Aldrea does not leave Cassie’s body. Aldrea leaves, and the Animorphs and Toby head back to Earth.

Morphs

References 

Animorphs books
1999 novels
1999 science fiction novels
Novels set on fictional planets
Novels about cloning
Novels about spirit possession
Novels with multiple narrators